Sitaras, before 1927 known as Zitovo (Σίτοβο), is a village and a community of the Grevena municipality. Before the 2011 local government reform it was a part of the municipality of Gorgiani, of which it was a municipal district. The 2011 census recorded 20 residents in the village. The community of Sitaras covers an area of 10.375 km2.

See also
List of settlements in the Grevena regional unit

References

Populated places in Grevena (regional unit)